Arthur Charles "Barney" Gillerain (May 27, 1887 – August 25, 1954) was a Canadian professional ice hockey player. He played with the Renfrew Creamery Kings of the National Hockey Association.

References

1887 births
1954 deaths
People from Brockville
Ice hockey people from Ontario
Renfrew Hockey Club players
Canadian ice hockey right wingers